Khoshk Rud (also Romanized as Khoshk Rūd; also known as Khoshkeh Rood, Khoshkeh Rūd, Khoshke Rūd, and Khushkrūd) is a village in Poshtkuh Rural District, in the Central District of Khansar County, Isfahan Province, Iran. At the 2006 census, its population was 287, in 79 families.

References 

Populated places in Khansar County